Séamus Mackey (born 1938 in Carrick-on-Suir, County Tipperary) is a retired Irish sportsperson.  He played hurling with his local club Carrick Swans and was a member of the Tipperary senior inter-county team in the 1960s. Mackey won a set of All-Ireland and Munster titles with Tipperary as a non-playing sub in 1965.

References

1938 births
Living people
Carrick Swans hurlers
Tipperary inter-county hurlers